Sepsina is a genus of skinks (family Scincidae). The genus is endemic to southern Africa.

Taxonomy
This genus is presently placed in the subfamily Scincinae, a subfamily which seems to be paraphyletic however. Sepsina belongs to a major clade of this group which does not seem to include the type genus Scincus. Thus, it will probably be eventually assigned to a new, yet-to-be-named subfamily.

Species
The following five species are recognized:

Sepsina alberti Hewitt, 1929 – Albert's skink, Albert's burrowing skink 
Sepsina angolensis Bocage, 1866 – Angola skink
Sepsina bayonii (Bocage, 1866) – Bayon's skink
Sepsina copei Bocage, 1873 – sepsina skink, Cope's reduced-limb skink 
Sepsina tetradactyla W. Peters, 1874 – four-fingered skink

References

Further reading
 (2006). "Using ancient and recent DNA to explore relationships of extinct and endangered Leiolopisma skinks (Reptilia: Scincidae) in the Mascarene islands". Molecular Phylogenetics and Evolution 39 (2): 503–511.  (HTML abstract)
Bocage JVB (1866). "Reptiles nouveaux ou peu connus recueillis dans les possessions portugaises de l'Afrique occidentale, qui se trouvent au Muséum de Lisbonne". Jornal de Sciencias Mathematicas Physicas e Naturaes, Academia Real das Sciencias de Lisboa 1: 57–78. (Sepsina, new genus, p. 62; Sepsina angolensis, new species, p. 63; Dumerilia, new genus, p. 63; Dumerilia bayonii, new species, pp. 63–64). (in French).
Branch, Bill (2004). Field Guide to Snakes and other Reptiles of Southern Africa. Third Revised edition, Second impression. Sanibel Island, Florida: Ralph Curtis Books. 399 pp. . (Genus Sepsina, p. 145; Sepsina alberti, p. 145 + Plate 49; Sepsina angolensis, p. 146 + Plate 101).

Sepsina
Lizard genera
Taxa named by José Vicente Barbosa du Bocage